Jean-Guillaume Béatrix (born 24 March 1988) is a retired French biathlete who has competed since 2005 till 2018. He was won the silver medal in the relay at the World Championships in 2012 and 2013, as well as the bronze in the Pursuit at the 2014 Olympics at Sochi. Béatrix has had four podium finishes in World Cup races in individual races.

Career

Early career
Béatrix started competing in biathlon in 2005. He competed for France at the Junior World Championships where he won the Bronze in the individual race and the relay in 2007. He went on the become Junior World Champion in the Individual the following year.

Results

Olympics
1 medal (1 bronze)

World Championships
5 medals (4 silver, 1 bronze)

Biathlon World Cup
Overall record

Season Standings

Statistics as of 15 March 2015. Season 2014–15 in progress.

Individual victories
1 victory

Relay victories
7 victories

References

External links

1988 births
Living people
French male biathletes
Biathlon World Championships medalists
Biathletes at the 2014 Winter Olympics
Olympic biathletes of France
Olympic medalists in biathlon
Olympic bronze medalists for France
Medalists at the 2014 Winter Olympics
Université Savoie-Mont Blanc alumni
Knights of the Ordre national du Mérite
Sportspeople from Lyon Metropolis